Honeywill is a surname. Notable people with the surname include:

Greer Honeywill (born 1945), Australian artist
Ross Honeywill (born 1949), Australian philosopher

See also
Honeywill and Stein Ltd v Larkin Brothers Ltd, 1934 English law case
Honnywill (disambiguation)
Honeywell (disambiguation)